was a Japanese actor active from 1936 to 1977. A popular star of the Shōchiku film studios, he is best known for his appearances in the films of Yasujirō Ozu, Keisuke Kinoshita, Heinosuke Gosho and Hiroshi Shimizu.

Selected filmography
 1936: The New Road (Part one) (新道前篇, Shindo: Zenpen) – dir. Heinosuke Gosho
 1937: What Did the Lady Forget? (淑女は何を忘れたか, Shukujo wa nani o wasureta ka) – dir. Yasujirō Ozu
 1937: Konjiki yasha (金色夜叉) – dir. Hiroshi Shimizu
 1937: Forget Love for Now (恋も忘れて, Koi mo wasurete) – dir. Hiroshi Shimizu
 1942: There Was a Father (父ありき, Chichi Ariki) – dir. Yasujirō Ozu
 1944: Army (陸軍, Rikugun) – dir. Keisuke Kinoshita
 1948: A Hen in the Wind (風の中の牝鶏, Kaze no naka no mendori) – dir. Yasujirō Ozu
 1949: A Toast to the Young Miss (お嬢さん乾杯, Ojōsan kanpai) – dir. Keisuke Kinoshita
 1951: Carmen Comes Home (カルメン故郷に帰る, Karumen kokyō ni kaeru) – dir. Keisuke Kinoshita
 1951: Early Summer (麦秋, Bakushu) – dir. Yasujirō Ozu
 1953: Mogura Yokochō (もぐら横丁) – dir. Hiroshi Shimizu
 1954: An Inn at Osaka (大阪の宿, Osaka no yado) – dir. Heinosuke Gosho
 1954: The Cock Crows Twice (鶏はふたゝび鳴く, Niwatori wa futatabi naku) – dir. Heinosuke Gosho
 1955: The Moon Has Risen (月は昇りぬ, Tsuki wa noborinu) – dir. Kinuyo Tanaka
 1955: The Maid's Kid (女中ッ子, Jochūkko) – dir. Tomotaka Tasaka
 1956: Sudden Rain (驟雨, Shūu) – dir. Mikio Naruse

References

External links

Bibliography
 

1912 births
1978 deaths
20th-century Japanese male actors